Empress Xiaohui may refer to:

 Empress Zhang Yan, formally Xiaohui, Han dynasty empress
 Empress Xiaohui (Song dynasty), first wife of Zhao Kuangyin
 Empress Xiaohui (Ming dynasty), consort of the Chenghua Emperor
 Empress Xiaohuizhang, second Empress Consort of the Shunzhi Emperor of the Qing Dynasty